The Banks of the Oise is an 1877-1878 painting by Alfred Sisley. Previously owned by three private galleries (the Bernheim-Jeune in Paris, the Dilenn in Brussels and finally the Galerie Jacques Dubourg in Paris) it was sold to Chester Dale on 9 June 1926. It is now owned by the National Gallery of Art in Washington, DC, which acquired it with the rest of Dale's collection - it is now on display in section 88 (French Impressionist landscapes).

References

1878 paintings
Collections of the National Gallery of Art
Paintings by Alfred Sisley
Maritime paintings